José de Jesús González Muñoz, or 'Tepa' González; (born 19 November 1998) is a Mexican professional footballer who plays as a forward for Tapatío, on loan from Guadalajara.

Personal life
González has a son named Enzo with the singer Sabina Hidalgo , who he has been dating off and on since 2017, from Now United.

Career statistics

Club

References

External links
 
 Jose González at Flashscore 
 

1998 births
Living people
Mexican expatriate footballers
Association football forwards
C.D. Guadalajara footballers
CD Tudelano footballers
Leones Negros UdeG footballers
Segunda División B players
Liga MX players
Ascenso MX players
Footballers from Jalisco
Mexican expatriate sportspeople in Spain
Expatriate footballers in Spain
Mexican footballers